Jonn is a masculine given name. Notable people with the name include:

 Jonn Penney (born 1968), English musician
 Jonn Serrie (fl. 21st century), American composer

See also

 John (given name)
 Johnie
 Johnn
 Johnny (given name)
 Johny (disambiguation)
 Jonathan (name)
 Joni (disambiguation)
 Jonie
 Jonni
 Jonnie
 Jony

Masculine given names